Yarımca is a village in the Emirdağ District, Afyonkarahisar Province, Turkey. Its population is 71 (2021). It was once the home to author Halife Altay.

References

Villages in Emirdağ District